Pieces in a Modern Style 2 is the 11th album by British electronic musician and record producer, William Orbit. A follow-up to  Orbit's 1995 album Pieces in a Modern Style, it was released in compact disc and digital download formats on 22 August 2010 through Decca Records. Orbit's second foray into classical music by way of electronic instrumentation includes, among others, a selection from Pyotr Ilyich Tchaikovsky's Swan Lake. A 2-CD version, with remixes and additional pieces was also released.

A Deutsche Grammophon 2010 release Classic Originals - Pieces In The Original Style 2 (Catalogue number 478 2589) featured the original versions of the tracks on this CD, which included contributions from Cristina Ortiz, Pascal Rogé, András Schiff, Iona Brown and Renée Fleming; conductors included Charles Dutoit, Herbert Blomstedt and Sir Georg Solti.

Track listing

CD 1/digital release

CD 2

References

2010 albums
William Orbit albums
Albums produced by William Orbit
Sequel albums
Decca Records albums